Cluny Brown is a 1946 American romantic comedy made by Twentieth Century-Fox, directed and produced by Ernst Lubitsch. The screenplay was written by Samuel Hoffenstein and Elizabeth Reinhardt based on the 1944 novel by Margery Sharp. The music score is by Cyril J. Mockridge. The film, starring Charles Boyer and Jennifer Jones, is a satire on the smugness of British high society and the last film Lubitsch completed before his death in 1947.

Plot
In 1938 London, Cluny Brown meets Adam Belinski while fixing a plumbing issue at Mr. Ames' and the two strike a chord. Later, at a party at Ames', the self-obsessed Betty Cream is pursued by two young men: Andrew Carmel and John Frewen. Cream stumbles upon a sleeping Belinski, whom the men recognize as the prominent anti-Nazi author Professor Adam Belinski. Andrew offers to allow Belinski to stay at his family's residence outside London while Andrew leaves for London.

Brown's uncle (also her guardian), disapproving of her unladylike behavior, sends her to work as the parlor maid for Andrew's family (headed by Sir Henry Carmel and Lady Carmel), much to her displeasure. Upon arrival, Brown is put under the contemptuous eyes of housekeeper Mrs. Maile and Syrette. At dinner, Brown is surprised to see Belinski. After dinner, Belinski is shown to a room with a nightingale under the window. Later, Belinski finds Brown and they realize that they are out of place at the Carmels' and make a pact to be platonic friends, even though Belinski is clearly interested in her.

One afternoon, Brown tells Belinski that she has been invited by chemist Jonathan Wilson to meet his mother. At Wilson's, Brown is amazed by Wilson's mannerisms and array of skills. Meanwhile, Belinski rings Wilson's doorbell and disappears. After the meeting, Belinski finds Wilson and acknowledges that he is a good man for Brown. Belinski tries to dissuade Brown from engaging with Wilson but she misinterprets his words and becomes more smitten with him.

Andrew returns after a row with Cream in London the previous day and is thus shocked to find that Cream is a guest at their residence. Belinski persuades Cream to let Brown, her personal maid, off the rest of the evening so she may attend Mrs. Wilson's birthday party, where Wilson may announce his engagement to Brown. When something goes awry with the plumbing during the Wilsons' party, Brown cannot resist the chance to show her skill at plumbing and bangs loudly and disruptively with a wrench on the offending pipe until it is fixed, startling the Wilsons and their guests. Mrs. Wilson, expressing her disapproval, promptly retires for the night, and the guests, sensing that things have gone wrong, leave just as suddenly and quickly; Mr. Wilson is exasperated and has second thoughts about his intentions with Cluny Brown.

That evening, Belinski enters Cream's bedroom, asking her to be nicer to Andrew, but Cream believes Belinski is trying to seduce her and screams. A furious Andrew tries to confront Belinski but Lady Carmel persuades him to sleep. In Cream's room, Cream tells Lady Carmel that she intends to marry Andrew and will tell him so in the morning. The next morning, Andrew decides to settle the score with a fight, but if there is one, it is not shown and the result is unclear.

Brown falls ill and Belinski suddenly announces his departure. He asks Maile to give her his parting present and wishes Brown well with Mr. Wilson. Just as Belinski leaves, Brown rushes out and catches up with him at the train station. She reveals that while Mr. Wilson was disappointed by her behavior that night, he will ask his mother to give her another chance. However, Belinski ushers her onto the train. He professes his love to her, promising that to support both of them, he will write a best-selling murder mystery. They embrace and kiss.

In the window of the "Fifth Avenue Bookstore", copies of Belinski's novels "The Nightingale Murder" and "The Nightingale Strikes Again!" are displayed.

Cast

Charles Boyer as Adam Belinski
Jennifer Jones as Cluny Brown
Peter Lawford as Andrew Carmel
Helen Walker as Betty Cream
Reginald Gardiner as Hilary Ames
Reginald Owen as Sir Henry Carmel
C. Aubrey Smith as Colonel Charles Duff Graham
Richard Haydn as Jonathan Wilson
Margaret Bannerman as Lady Alice Carmel
Sara Allgood as Mrs. Maile
Ernest Cossart as Syrette
Florence Bates as Dowager at Ames' Party
Una O'Connor as Mrs. Wilson
Billy Bevan as Arn Porritt, Cluny's uncle (uncredited)
Charles Coleman as Constable Birkins (uncredited)
Michael Dyne as John Frewen (uncredited)
Christopher Severn as Master Ronald Snaffle (uncredited)

Reviews 
A New York Times review in 1946 called the film a "delectable and sprightly lampoon" and "among the year's most delightful comedies". A reviewer for Variety wrote "Cluny Brown is in the best Lubitsch tradition of subtle, punchy comedy, and his two stars make the most of it. It is a satire on British manners, with bite and relish."

Radio adaptation
Cluny Brown was presented on Star Playhouse on November 15, 1953. The adaptation starred Celeste Holm.

References

External links
 
 
 
 
Cluny Brown on Screen Directors Playhouse: November 23, 1950
Cluny Brown at the American Film Institute Catalog
Cluny Brown: The Joys of Plumbing an essay by Siri Hustvedt at the Criterion Collection

Films based on romance novels
1946 films
20th Century Fox films
American black-and-white films
1946 romantic comedy films
Films directed by Ernst Lubitsch
Films based on British novels
Films based on works by Margery Sharp
Films scored by Cyril J. Mockridge
American romantic comedy films
1940s English-language films
1940s American films